Indira Devi is Indian politician from the state of Rajasthan. Since 2018, she is a member of the Rajasthan Legislative Assembly representing the Merta constituency. She is affiliated to the Rashtriya Loktantrik Party.

References 

Living people
Rashtriya Loktantrik Party politicians
People from Nagaur district
Year of birth missing (living people)
Rajasthan MLAs 2018–2023